is a Japanese TV and radio network affiliated with the Japan News Network (JNN). Its headquarters are located in Miyagi Prefecture, Tōhoku region.

Network
 Television
 Japan News Network (JNN)
 Radio
 Japan Radio Network (JRN)
 National Radio Network (NRN)

TV channel
 Sendai JOIR-TV 1Ch VIDEO:10 kW AUDIO:2.5 kW

Radio frequency
 Sendai JOIR 1260 kHz 50 kW; 93.5 MHz 5 kW
 Kesennuma JOIO 801 kHz 100 W
 Narugo (Old Call Sign:JOIE) 1557 kHz 100 W
 Shizugawa 1215 kHz 100 W

In the 1990s there was a failed attempt to broadcast in stereo; all radio broadcasts are in mono.

Program

They broadcast all programs shown on TBS and MBS, in addition to some local programming:

TV
 Watching! Miyagi
 Evening News TBC
 TBC POWERFUL BASEBALL (Tohoku Rakuten Golden Eagles)
 Thrilling TV GURAMARASU(end) 
 AKB0048 etc...

Radio
 Good Mornin!!
 IKINARI etc...

External links
 HOME PAGE

Japan News Network
Television stations in Japan
Radio in Japan
Television channels and stations established in 1959